The North Dakota State Bison volleyball team is the NCAA Division I women's volleyball team at North Dakota State University located in Fargo, North Dakota. The program began its first season in 1965 under head coach Collette Folstad. The current Bison head coach is Jennifer Lopez in her 6th season. Lopez took over after former coach Kari Thompson resigned after the 2016 season.

History
The Bison made the AIAW tournament every time from 1970 to 1981, except for two seasons in 1972 and 1980. Then in Division II, NDSU played in a regional every year from 1982 to 2003, except for 1985 and 1994. While in Division II, the Bison finished in the Elite Eight five times, the Final Four three times, and a national runner-up twice.
Since North Dakota State entered Division I in 2008, the Bison have made the NCAA tournament three times.
The team also made the NIVC tournament in 2022 after falling short in the semifinal round of the Summit League tournament.

The Bison have been apart of multiple conferences. While in the AIAW, NDSU played in the Minn-Kota Conference from 1970-78. It was a conference mainly centered around AIAW programs in Minnesota and both North and South Dakota. Then in 1979, the team joined the North Central Conference and followed along as the league moved up to Division II starting in the 1982 season. The Bison would remain there until the end of the 2003 season when NDSU's athletic programs moved up to Division I. While moving up, NDSU was an independent. Starting in the 2007 season, the Bison played in the Summit League and have remained there ever since.

Season-by-season history

^ - Played in Spring 2021

AIAW/NCAA/NIVC Tournament History

NCAA Division I Tournament History
The Bison have appeared in three NCAA Division I tournaments. Their combined record is 0–3.

National Invitational Volleyball Championship History
The Bison have appeared in 1 NIVC tournament. Their combined record is 0-1.

NCAA Division II Tournament History
The Bison have appeared in 20 NCAA Division II tournaments. Their combined record was 28–22.

References